Patrick or Paddy Doherty  may refer to:

 Paddy Doherty (activist) (1926–2016), Northern Irish activist
 Pat Doherty (politician) (born 1945), Irish politician
 Paddy Doherty (Gaelic footballer) (born 1934), Gaelic footballer
 Paddy Doherty (TV personality) (born 1959), Irish Traveller and bare-knuckle boxer
 Pat Doherty (boxer) (born 1962), English boxer 
 Patrick J. Doherty, United States Air Force general

See also
 Pat Doherty (disambiguation)
 Pat O'Doherty, Australian rugby player